The T class was a class of diesel locomotives built by Tulloch Limited, Rhodes for the Western Australian Government Railways between 1967 and 1970.

History
The first five members of the class were fitted with two  traction motors connected in parallel to a Brush  main generator. Two further batches of five followed; these locomotives, designated as the TA class, had uprated  main generators.

The first was built by Tulloch Limited with the remainder sent to Western Australia in parts and assembled locally. UGL Rail use TA1813 as their shunter at Bassendean.

References

External links

History of Western Australia Railways & Stations T gallery
History of Western Australia Railways & Stations TA gallery

Diesel locomotives of Western Australia
Railway locomotives introduced in 1967
Tulloch Limited locomotives
0-6-0 locomotives
3 ft 6 in gauge locomotives of Australia
Diesel-electric locomotives of Australia